Three Steps to Heaven may refer to:

Three Steps to Heaven (TV series), a 1950s TV series
"Three Steps to Heaven" (song), a song by Eddie Cochran, later covered by Showaddywaddy